Teyah Doreen Bliss Goldie (born 27 June 2004) is an English women's football player who currently plays for Arsenal of the FA WSL and the England U19 national team.

Club career
Goldie made her Arsenal debut on 18 April 2021, coming off the bench in a 10–0 FA Cup win over Gillingham Women.

She made her Champions League debut on 18 August 2021, coming on in the 76th minute of a 4–0 win against Okzhetpes.

On 22 January 2022, she joined Watford of the Women's Championship on a dual registration agreement.

Goldie was awarded Watford Player of the Month for February but her loan spell was cut short when she ruptured her anterior cruciate ligament against Sheffield United on 5 March 2022.

On her 18th birthday, 27 June 2022, Goldie signed her first professional contract with Arsenal.

International career
Goldie has represented England at youth level, captaining them at U15 level. She made her England U19 national team debut on 30 July 2021, in a 4–1 win over the Czech Republic

Career statistics
.

References

2004 births
Living people
English women's footballers
Women's Super League players
Arsenal W.F.C. players
Women's association football defenders
England women's youth international footballers
Watford F.C. Women players